The women's 58 kilograms weightlifting event was the third women's event at the weightlifting competition, with competitors limited to a maximum of 58 kilograms of body mass. The whole competition took place on August 11, but was divided in two parts due to the number of competitors. Group B weightlifters competed at 12:30, and Group A, at 15:30. This event was the fourth weightlifting event to conclude.

Each lifter performed in both the snatch and clean and jerk lifts, with the final score being the sum of the lifter's best result in each. The athlete received three attempts in each of the two lifts; the score for the lift was the heaviest weight successfully lifted.

Schedule 
All times are China Standard Time (UTC+08:00)

Records

Results

 Marina Shainova of Russia originally won the silver medal, but she was disqualified after a re-analysis of her 2008 sample tested positive for steroids.

New records

References 

 Page 2633

Weightlifting at the 2008 Summer Olympics
Women's events at the 2008 Summer Olympics
Olymp